Thomas Gwynfor Hughes (7 May 1922 – 14 March 1999) was a Welsh professional footballer who played as a wing half.

Career
Born in Blaenau Ffestiniog, Hughes played for Blaenau Ffestiniog Amateur, Northampton Town and Bedford Town.

References

1922 births
1999 deaths
People from Blaenau Ffestiniog
Sportspeople from Gwynedd
Welsh footballers
Blaenau Ffestiniog Amateur F.C. players
Northampton Town F.C. players
Bedford Town F.C. players
English Football League players
Association football wing halves